The Otze Forest Wildlife Sanctuary is a government-managed wildlife sanctuary in Uganda. The site covers 0.39 km².

References

National parks of Uganda
Animal sanctuaries
Wildlife sanctuaries of Uganda